The Association of Alternative Newsmedia (AAN) is a trade association of alternative weekly newspapers in North America. It provides services to many generally liberal or progressive weekly newspapers across the United States and in Canada. AAN also operates AltWeeklies.com — a web portal that highlights the best news stories, features, arts criticism, and political commentary from its member newspapers.

History 
The Association of Alternative Newsweeklies was founded in 1978 in Seattle, Washington, with 30 newspapers from America's largest cities.

In July 2011, the organization's name was changed to the Association of Alternative Newsmedia by a vote of members attending the group's annual meeting.

Members
The association is made up of 131 newspapers which are published in 42 states, Washington D.C., and four Canadian provinces. States not represented are Alaska, Delaware, Kansas, New Hampshire, New Jersey, North Dakota, South Dakota, and West Virginia.

Former members

See also 
 Alternative Press Syndicate

References

External links 
 

1978 establishments in Washington (state)
501(c)(6) nonprofit organizations
 
Newspaper associations
Non-profit organizations based in Washington (state)
Organizations based in Seattle
Organizations established in 1978
Print syndication